(March 6, 1970 - May 4, 2000) was a Japanese Thoroughbred racehorse.

Racing career
In 1972, at age two, Haiseiko began racing at the Oi Racecourse for the Japanese National Association of Racing.  He was undefeated in six starts at Oi Racecourse.

At age three, Haiseiko was traded to the Japan Racing Association.  He won the Satsuki Sho, the first of the Japanese Classic Races but then finished third Take Hope in the Tokyo Yushun and second to the same horse in the Kikuka Sho.

At age four, Haiseiko won the Takarazuka Kinen.

Stud career
Retired to stud, Haiseiko sired the Tokyo Yushun winner Katsurano Haiseiko, the Satsuki Sho winner Haku Taisei, the Tokyo Derby winner King Haiseiko and Outrun Seiko.  He was the Leading Sire in NAR for 1990.

Honors
Haiseiko was inducted in the Japan Racing Association Hall of Fame in 1984.

Pedigree

References 
 Haiseiko's pedigree and partial racing stats

See also 
 National Association of Racing
 Niikappu, Hokkaido

Racehorses bred in Japan
Racehorses trained in Japan
1970 racehorse births
2000 racehorse deaths
Thoroughbred family 12-g